Brent Eccles is best known as the drummer for The Angels, an Australian pub rock band. He has also drummed in: The Breed, Vox Pop, Stuart & The Belmonts, Streetalk, Space Waltz, After Hours, and Citizen Band.

Eccles left Citizen Band in 1981, after successfully auditioning for The Angels and remained there until they split up in 2000. During this time he also managed Johnny Diesel & The Injectors, The Poor and The Angels. He is the father of former Betchadupa drummer, and now Das Pop drummer Matt Eccles.
Today Brent lives in New Zealand and runs his own agency Brent Eccles Entertainment as well as representing Frontier Touring, A Day On The Green and Liberation Music.  Along with Campbell Smith, Brent also heads Civic Events who run the annual Acoustic Church Tour and the Winery Tour.

In October 2018 he was presented with the Fullers Entertainment Award from the Variety Artists Club of New Zealand for his contribution to NZ entertainment as a promoter.

References

External links

Living people
New Zealand musicians
Male drummers
The Angels (Australian band) members
Year of birth missing (living people)